IgG deficiency  is a form of dysgammaglobulinemia where the proportional levels of the IgG isotype are reduced relative to other immunoglobulin isotypes. IgG deficiency is often found in children as transient hypogammaglobulinemia of infancy (THI), which may occur with or without additional decreases in IgA or IgM.

IgG has four subclasses: IgG1, IgG2, IgG3, and IgG4. It is possible to have either a global IgG deficiency, or a deficiency of one or more specific subclasses of IgG. The main clinically relevant form of IgG deficiency is IgG2. IgG3 deficiency is not usually encountered without other concomitant immunoglobulin deficiencies, and IgG4 deficiency is very common but usually asymptomatic.

IgG1 is present in the bloodstream at a percentage of about 60-70%, IgG2-20-30%, IgG3 about 5-8 %, and IgG4 1-3 %. IgG subclass deficiencies affect only IgG subclasses (usually IgG2 or IgG3), with normal total IgG and IgM immunoglobulins and other components of the immune system being at normal levels. These deficiencies can affect only one subclass or involve an association of two subclasses, such as IgG2 and IgG4. IgG deficiencies are usually not diagnosed until the age of 12. Some of the IgG levels in the blood are undetectable and have a low percentage such as IgG4, which makes it hard to determine if a deficiency is actually present. IgG subclass deficiencies are sometimes correlated with bad responses to pneumoccal polysaccharides, especially IgG2 and or IgG4 deficiency. Some of these deficiencies are also involved with pancreatitis and have been linked to IgG4 levels.

References

External links 

Predominantly antibody deficiencies